Raconda russeliana, the raconda, is a species of ray-finned fish of the family Pristigasteridae. It is found in the Indian Ocean and the Java Sea from the eastern coast of India to the island of Borneo. This species is the only one in its genus.

References

Pristigasteridae
Taxa named by John Edward Gray
Fish of Asia
Monotypic ray-finned fish genera
Monotypic marine fish genera